Sertić is a Croatian surname. Notable people with the surname include:
Jozef Sertić, Government Commissioner for Sarajevo during Austro-Hungarian rule in Bosnia and Herzegovina. He was awarded the Honorary Citizenship of the City of Sarajevo in 1879.
Ivan Sertić (born 1985), Croatian footballer
Grégory Sertic (born 1989), French footballer of Croatian descent 
Kornelija Sertić, first woman to graduate from the School of Medicine in Zagreb
Tomislav Sertić (1902–1945), Croatian soldier

Croatian surnames
Slavic-language surnames
Patronymic surnames